Richard Mansfield Dudley (July 28, 1938 – January 19, 2020) was Professor of Mathematics at the Massachusetts Institute of Technology.

Education and career 
Dudley was born in Cleveland, Ohio. He earned his BA at Harvard College and received his PhD at Princeton University in 1962 under the supervision of Edward Nelson and Gilbert Hunt.  He was a Putnam Fellow in 1958. He was an instructor and assistant professor at University of California, Berkeley between 1962 and 1967, before moving to MIT as a professor in mathematics, where he stayed from 1967 until 2015, when he retired.

He died on January 19, 2020, following a long illness.

Research 
His work mainly concerned fields of probability, mathematical statistics, and machine learning, with highly influential contributions to the theory of Gaussian processes and empirical processes. He published over a hundred papers in peer-reviewed journals and authored several books. His specialty was probability theory and statistics, especially empirical processes. He is often noted for his results on the so-called Dudley entropy integral. In 2012 he became a fellow of the American Mathematical Society.

Books

References 

 R. S. Wenocur and R. M. Dudley, "Some special Vapnik–Chervonenkis classes," Discrete Mathematics, vol. 33, pp. 313–318, 1981.

External links 
 Publications from Google Scholar.
 A Conversation with Dick Dudley

1938 births
2020 deaths
20th-century American mathematicians
21st-century American mathematicians
American statisticians
Probability theorists
Princeton University alumni
Massachusetts Institute of Technology School of Science faculty
Fellows of the American Mathematical Society
Fellows of the American Statistical Association
Putnam Fellows
Harvard College alumni
Annals of Probability editors
Mathematical statisticians